Fairmont Plaza (previously the Knight-Ridder Building) is a 17-story,  skyscraper in downtown San Jose, California. When completed in 1988, it was the tallest building in the city; it is currently the sixth. The building was designed by the Skidmore, Owings & Merrill architecture firm.

History
Fairmont Plaza was completed in 1988. At the time, it was the tallest building in San Jose. San Jose's first skyscraper, the 1909, seven-story, Garden City Bank & Trust Building, and the 1926, seven-story, American Trust Building were razed on the site to make way for the project.

In 1998, newspaper publisher Knight Ridder moved its headquarters from Miami to the building, renaming it the Knight-Ridder Building. The move was seen as an acknowledgement of the central role that online news would play in the company's future. The McClatchy Company purchased Knight Ridder in 2006, but the company's sign remained at the top of the building until 2016.

CBRE Global Investors purchased the building in 2012 about US$90 million.

References

Office buildings completed in 1988
Skyscraper office buildings in San Jose, California
Skidmore, Owings & Merrill buildings